Simone Monika Strobel (c.1980 – c.11 to 17 February 2005) was a 25-year-old German kindergarten teacher and backpacker whose body was found at a sportsground in Lismore, New South Wales, six days after being reported missing from the caravan park where she had been staying. An initial inquest in 2007 found insufficient evidence to lay charges over her death.

Murder
Prior to her murder, Strobel - a German national from Würzburg, Bavaria - had been backpacking through Australia with her boyfriend, Tobias Suckfuell, Suckfuell's sister, Katrin, and their friend, Jens Martin. On 11 February 2005, the group checked in to the Lismore Tourist Caravan Park. That evening, they spent the night drinking at the Gollan Hotel, before being ejected at 11.10pm by the bar manager. The group reportedly returned to the caravan park to continue their evening.

The following morning at 10.45am, Suckfuell and Martin reported Strobel missing at the Lismore Police Station, telling the police that she had left the campsite during the night after an argument had broken out between the Suckfuell siblings. The police subsequently put out a public appeal for information and carried out an extensive search.

Strobel's nude body was discovered on 17 February 2005 by the NSW Dog Unit on a bocce court less than 100 metres from the campsite where she had disappeared, covered by palm fronds. Her cause of death is unconfirmed; investigators told the 2007 inquest that they believed her cause of death to be asphyxia or suffocation.

Investigation
Following the discovery of Strobel's body, the Richmond Police District, with assistance from the Würzburg Criminal Police, and the Würzburg Prosecutor's Office, established Strike Force Howea to investigate her murder.

A coronial inquest into Strobel's death was held in 2007, with State Coroner Paul McMahon presiding. Both Tobias and Katrin Suckfuell declined to testify, and Martin was the only member of the group to do so. Ultimately, McMahon ruled that there was insufficient evidence to lay charges for the murder.

In 2014, the Bavarian Office of Criminal Investigation announced a €10,000 reward for information leading to an arrest or conviction. In addition, on 15 October 2020, the New South Wales Government and police announced a $1 million reward. 

A second coronial inquest was initially scheduled for February 2021. It has since been delayed due to the COVID-19 pandemic.

Arrest

In July 2022, Tobias Moran (formerly Tobias Suckfuell) was arrested by Strike Force Howea detectives in Western Australia, in connection with Strobel's murder. He appeared before Perth Magistrates' court on 26 July 2022 and remanded in custody pending extradition to New South Wales, where he will face a court in Sydney. Upon his extradition, Moran was charged with murder and attempting to pervert the course of justice. Further arrest warrants were issued for Katrin Suckfuell and Jens Martin, in relation to allegations of being accessories after the fact.

Media
Strobel's murder was the subject of the book "Have You Seen Simone?" by Virginia Peters. In 2014, Moran took out an injunction to prevent its publication, and subsequently sued both Peters and the book's publisher, Schwarz Publishing, for defamation. The lawsuit was dropped in 2017.

On 15 July 2017, Strobel's murder was featured in episode 55 of Casefile True Crime Podcast. The episode was subsequently removed and remains unavailable for legal reasons and general details of the podcast itself are still publicly available.

References

1980 births
2005 deaths
2005 in Australia
People murdered in New South Wales
2005 murders in Australia
2000s in New South Wales